The Muhajir people (also spelled Mahajir and Mohajir) are Muslim immigrants of various ethnic groups and regional origins, and their descendants, who migrated from various regions of India after the Partition of India to settle in the newly independent state of Pakistan. The term "Muhajirs" refers to those Muslim migrants from India, who settled in urban Sindh, while muslim migrants who settled in other parts of Pakistan dropped the term. The Muhajir community also includes stranded Pakistanis in Bangladesh who migrated to Pakistan after 1971 following the secession of East Pakistan in the Bangladesh Liberation War.

The group's most widely spoken and culture language is Urdu, an Indo-Iranian language in the Indo-Aryan language branch of the Indo-European language family. Muhajirs also speak several other languages natively, including Hindi, Gujarati, Rajasthani, and Malayalam.

Muhajirs are the fifth-largest ethnic group of Pakistan. The total population of the Muhajir people worldwide is estimated to be around 15 million, and this figure was supported by the official census in 2017 which showed the Muhajir population to be around 14.7 million. The official population census of Karachi, currently with the largest Muhajir population, has been challenged by most political parties of Sindh. Some organizations including independent ones estimate the muhajir population to be around 30 million.

The Muhajirs are the most educated, and affluent ethnic group in Pakistan. Because of this, they constituted a influential community in the earlier years of post-partition Pakistan. During the first military dictatorship of Pakistan, the political power of muhajir at centre declined and this decline continued into the era of Zulfikar Ali Bhutto. Today, muhajirs have lost most of their political influence at federal level, although they continue to dominate the politics of Urban Sindh and the economy of Pakistan.

Etymology 
The Urdu term muhājir comes from the Arabic muhājir, meaning an "immigrant", or "emigrant". This term is associated in early Islamic history to the migration of Muslims and connotes 'separation, migration, flight, specifically the flight of the Prophet from Mecca to Medina'. This term was popularized in Pakistan by the 1951 census, although its earliest uses date back to Partition.

Definition 
Among historians, anthropologists, and the Muhajirs themselves, there is some debate as to who exactly qualifies as a Muhajir. The most widely used definition is:

 Migrated to Pakistan from Muslim minority provinces of the subcontinent at the time of partition,
 Is not considered as belonging to any of the nationalities of Pakistan, neither Punjabi, nor Pashtun, nor Sindhi, nor Baloch,
 Migrated from those areas of East Punjab whose language and culture were not Punjabi.

The second clause of this definition has been rejected by many including the cricketer-politician Imran Khan, who considers himself a half muhajir because of his Pashtun mother's migration to Pakistan.

Demographics

Demographic origins 
Most of the muhajirs who settled in the Sindh province of Pakistan came from the present-day Indian states of Madhya Pradesh, Berar, Bombay, United Provinces, Haryana, Gujarat, Himachal Pradesh, and Delhi, while others were from princley states of Jammu and Kashmir, Rajasthan, Hyderabad, Baroda, Kutch, and the Rajputana Agency.

Population 
Muhajirs , worldwide, have a population of over 15 million. Muhajirs are mostly settled in Pakistan and currently are the fifth-largest ethnic group of Pakistan, with a population of around 14.7-30 million.
The muhajir population figures, especially in Pakistan, have faced many controversies mainly due to the controversial 2017 census of Pakistan. The muhajir population figure has been rejected by most major political parties of Sindh including MQM-P, PSP, and PPP. Estimates of Muhajir nationalist organizations range from 22 million to around 30 million.

Almost 51% of muhajirs are males while 49% are females, with a small transgender population.

Linguistic groups 
Muhajirs used to be a multi-linguistic ethnic group of people, therefore spoke different languages natively depending on their ethnicity and ancestral history. Although the use of the term "muhajir" and a sense of ethnic unity existed among these groups since 1947,  it took over a period of a few decades, for these disparate groups sharing the common experience of migration, and political opposition to the military regime of Ayub Khan and his civilian successor Zulfikar Ali Bhutto to fully assimilate into a distinct Urdu-speaking group.

Today, most Muhajirs speak Urdu, and Muhajirs are considered the third-largest Urdu-speaking ethnicity in the world. The muhajirs that speak Urdu as first language mostly migrated from Delhi, United Provinces and Hyderabad. The Biharis of Bangladesh have also fully assimilated into the Urdu-speaking muhajirs. These muhajirs have merged their dialects of Urdu to form a new dialect used by all muhajirs today. Many dialects of Hindi such as, Dakhani, Khariboli, Awadhi, Bhojpuri, Mewati, Sadri, Marwari, and Haryanvi are also spoken by the Urdu-speaking Muhajirs.

Gujarati Muhajirs mainly settled in the Pakistani province of Sindh, are considered the second largest sub-group within the muhajirs. Estimates say there are 3,500,000 ex-speakers of the Gujarati language in Karachi. Before 1970s Gujaratis used to speak their own language, although they identified with the Urdu-speakers. After the nationalization of schools in 1970s, Gujaratis left their own language and started to assimilate into the Urdu-speakers.

Non-Urdu speaking Muslim peoples from what is now the Republic of India, such as Rohingya, Marathi, Konkani, Rajasthanis who speak the Marwari dialect of Rajasthani language and several-thousand Malabari Muslims from Kerala in South India, are considered Muhajirs. These ethno-linguistic groups are being assimilated in the Urdu-speaking community.

Geographic distribution

Pakistan 

There are an estimated 14.7 million muhajirs in Pakistan, 7.08 percent of the total population, making Muhajirs the fifth largest ethnic group in Pakistan. Most of these Muhajirs are settled in the towns and cities of Pakistan mainly those of Urban Sindh, such as Karachi, Hyderabad, Mirpur Khas and Sukkur, this region is sometimes referred to as Urdu-speaking Sindh because of its large muhajir population.
Muhajir pockets are also found in other metropolises of Pakistan such as Islamabad and Lahore. Muhajirs represent 20.22% of Pakistan's urban population and 1.48% of the rural population.

Bangladesh 
Over 300,000 Biharis are currently settled in the urban areas of Bangladesh. These Urdu-speaking Muslims, mainly from Bihar, migrated to East Pakistan after the Partition of India. These migrants were mostly educated so they were easily absorbed in the fields of education, medicine, railways, police, armed forces and other important cadres. After the formation of Bangladesh in 1971, the Biharis maintained their loyalty to Pakistan and demanded repatriation from Bangladesh to Pakistan. At that time about 500,000 muhajirs were settled in Bangladesh, 178,000 have been repatriated, while the remaining 300,000 are still settled in Bangladesh. In 2003, these Muhajirs were granted nationality and the right to vote. As a result, the Pakistani government stated that the remaining 'Stranded Pakistanis' are not its responsibility but rather the responsibility of Bangladesh. These muhajirs are settled mainly in Shahjahan Pur, Kamla Pur, Motijheel, Purana Pultan, Nawabpur road, Nawab Bari, Thatheri Bazar, Moulvi Bazar, Armani Tola, Islam Pur, Azim Pur, Saddar Ghat, Eskatan, Dhanmandi, Dhakeshwari, Neel Khet.

History

Pre-Partition

Mughal Empire and Indian Rebellion of 1857 

The ancestors of the present day muhajirs started gaining political and cultural influence during the reign of the mughal emperor, Shah Alam II, who gave urdu the status of literary language, and replaced Persian as the language of the Muslim elite.

Prior to the Indian Rebellion of 1857, British territories in South Asia were controlled by the East India Company. The company maintained the fiction of running the territories on behalf of the Urdu-speaking Mughal empire. The Rebellion was initiated by the mutiny of the 3rd Bengal Light Cavalry in Meerut, which was composed mainly of Indian Muslims, capturing Delhi and massacring its garrison. 75% of the cavalry branch of the British native army was composed of Urdu-speaking Indian Muslims. The defeat of Mutineers in 1857 -1858 led to the abolition of the Mughal empire and the British government taking direct control of the Indian territories. In the immediate aftermath of the rebellion, upper-class Muslims, the ancestors of present-day Muhajirs, were targeted by the British, as some of the leadership for the war came from this community based in areas around Delhi and what is now Uttar Pradesh; thousands of them and their families were shot, hanged, or blown away by cannons. According to Mirza Ghalib, Urdu-speaking women were also targeted because the rebel soldiers sometimes disguised themselves as women. This era left a great impact on the history, culture and ideologies of present-day Muhajirs, and due to the large number of muhajirs being descended from Mughals, and the impact of mughals on muhajirs, muhajirs are sometimes referred to as "the grandchildren of Mughals".

Pakistan movement 

The Pakistan movement, to constitute a separate state comprising the Muslim-majority provinces, was pioneered by the Urdu-speaking Muslim elite and many notables of the Aligarh Movement. It was initiated in the 19th century when Sir Syed Ahmed Khan, the grandson of the Khwaja Fakhruddin, the Vizier of Akbar Shah II, expounded the cause of Muslim autonomy in Aligarh. In its early years, Muslim nobles such as nawabs (aristocrats and landed gentry) supported the idea, but as the idea spread, it gained great support amongst the Muslim population and in particular the rising middle and upper classes.

The Muslims launched the movement under the banner of the All India Muslim League and Delhi was its main centre. The headquarters of the All India Muslim League (the founding party of Pakistan) was based, since its creation in 1906, in Dhaka (present-day Bangladesh). The Muslim League won 90 percent of reserved Muslim seats in the 1946 elections and its demand for the creation of Pakistan received overwhelming popular support among Indian Muslims, especially in those provinces of British India such as U.P. where Muslims were a minority. On 14 August 1947, the muhajir led Pakistan movement succeeded in creating an independent state for Indian Muslims under the banner of Pakistan.

Migration 

The Partition of India was the largest migration in human history. Many Muslims migrating from India to Pakistan were killed by Hindus and Sikhs, while many Hindus and Sikhs were killed by Muslims. After the independence of Pakistan, a significant number of Muslims emigrated or were out-migrated from the territory that became the Dominion of India and later the Republic of India. In the aftermath of partition, a huge population exchange occurred between the two newly formed states. In the riots which preceded the partition, between 200,000 and 2,000,000 people were killed in the retributive genocide. UNHCR estimates 14 million Hindus, Sikhs, and Muslims were displaced during the partition; it was the largest mass migration in human history.

First stage (August–November 1947) 

There were three predominant stages of Muslim migration from India to West Pakistan. The first stage lasted from August–November 1947. In this stage of migration the Muslim immigrants originated from East Punjab, Delhi, the four adjacent districts of U.P., and the princely states of Alwar and Bharatpur which are now part of the present-day Indian state of Rajasthan. The violence affecting these areas during partition precipitated an exodus of Muslims from these areas to Pakistan. Punjabi Muslims from East Punjab crossed to West Punjab and settled in a culturally and linguistically similar environment.

The migration to Sindh was of a different nature to that in Punjab, as the migrants to Sindh were ethnically heterogenous and were linguistically different from the locals. The migrants were also more educated than the native, and predominantly rural Sindhi Muslims who had been less educated and less prosperous than the former Sindhi Hindu residents, suffered as a result. The migrants, who were urban, also tended to regard the local Sindhis as "backwards" and subservient to landowners.

Prior to the partition, the majority of urban Sindh's population had been Hindu, but after the independence of Pakistan in 1947, the majority of Sindh's Hindus migrated to India, although a substantial number of Hindus did remain in Sindh. 1.1 million Muslims from Uttar Pradesh, Bombay Presidency, Delhi, and Rajasthan settled in their place; half in Karachi and the rest across Sindh's other cities. By the 1951 census, the migrants constituted 57 percent of the population of Karachi, 65 percent in Hyderabad, and 55 percent in Sukkur. As Karachi was the capital of the new nation, educated urban migrants from Delhi, Uttar Pradesh, Bombay, Bihar, and Hyderabad Deccan preferred it as their site of settlement for better access to employment opportunities. The migrants were compensated for their properties lost in India by being granted the evacuee property left behind by the departing Hindus. A sizable community of Malayali Muslims (the Mappila), originally from Kerala in South India, also settled in Karachi.

Second stage (December 1947 – December 1971) 

Many Muslim families from India continued migrating to Pakistan throughout the 1950s and even early 1960s. This second stage (December 1947 – December 1971) of the migration was from areas in the present-day Indian states of U.P., Delhi, Gujarat, Rajasthan, Maharashtra, Madhya Pradesh, Karnataka, Telangana, Andhra Pradesh, Tamil Nadu, and Kerala. The main destination of these migrants was Karachi and the other urban centers of Sindh.

In 1952, a joint passport system was introduced for travel purposes between the two countries which made it possible for Indian Muslims to legally move to Pakistan. Pakistan still required educated and skilled workers to absorb into its economy at the time, due to relatively low levels of education (15.9 percent in 1961) in Pakistan. As late as December 1971, the Pakistan High Commission in New Delhi was authorized to issue documents to educationally-qualified Indians to migrate to Pakistan. The legal route was taken by unemployed but educated Indian Muslims seeking better fortunes, however poorer Muslims from India continued to go illegally via the Rajasthan-Sindh border until the 1965 India-Pakistan war when that route was shut. After the conclusion of the 1965 war, most Muslims who wanted to go to Pakistan had to go there via the East Pakistani-India border. Once reaching Dhaka, most made their way to the final destination-Karachi. However, not all managed to reach West Pakistan from East Pakistan.

In 1959, the International Labour Organization (ILO) published a report stating that between the period of 1951–1956, around 650,000 Muslims from India relocated to West Pakistan. However, Visaria (1969) raised doubts about the authenticity of the claims about Indian Muslim migration to Pakistan, since the 1961 Census of Pakistan did not corroborate these figures. However, the 1961 Census of Pakistan did incorporate a statement suggesting that there had been a migration of 800,000 people from India to Pakistan throughout the previous decade. Of those who had left for Pakistan, most never came back. The Indian Prime Minister Jawaharlal Nehru conveyed distress about the continued migration of Indian Muslims to West Pakistan:There has...since 1950 been a movement of some Muslims from India to Western Pakistan through Jodhpur-Sindh via Khokhropar. Normally, traffic between India and West Pakistan was controlled by the permit system. But these Muslims going via Khokhropar went without permits to West Pakistan. From January 1952 to the end of September, 53,209 Muslim emigrants went via Khokhropar....Most of these probably came from the U.P. In October 1952, up to the 14th, 6,808 went by this route. After that Pakistan became much stricter on allowing entry on the introduction of the passport system. From 15 October to the end of October, 1,247 went by this route. From 1 November, 1,203 went via Khokhropar.Indian Muslim migration to West Pakistan continued unabated despite the cessation of the permit system between the two countries and the introduction of the passport system between them.

Third stage (1973–1990s) 
The third stage, which lasted between 1973 and the 1990s, was when migration levels of Indian Muslims to Pakistan was reduced to its lowest levels since 1947. Indian Muslim migration to Pakistan had declined drastically by the 1970s, a trend noticed by the Pakistani authorities. In June 1995, Pakistan's interior minister, Naseerullah Babar, informed the National Assembly that between the period of 1973–1994, as many as 800,000 visitors came from India on valid travel documents, of which only 3,393 stayed. In a related trend, intermarriages between Indian and Pakistani Muslims have declined sharply. According to a November 1995 statement of Riaz Khokhar, the Pakistani High Commissioner in New Delhi, the number of cross-border marriages has declined from 40,000 a year in the 1950s and 1960s to barely 300 annually.

Politics

The Muhajirs dominated Pakistani politics from Partition till the era of Ayub Khan, but despite their fall from national politics muhajirs maintain a strong hold over the politics and economy of Urban Sindh. They have started many socio-political groups in Pakistan such as the Pakistan Muslim League under Muhammad Ali Jinnah, Muttahida Qaumi Movement under Altaf Hussain in 1984, the All Pakistan Muslim League under Pervez Musharraf, and Jamaat e Islami under Abul A'la Maududi.

Pre-independence era 

Most of the Muhajirs supported All-India Muslim League, and provided most of its top leadership such as Muhammad Ali Jinnah, Liaquat Ali Khan and Fatima Jinnah. The pan-Islamist Khilafat Movement also had considerable amount of support among the muhajirs and received most of its financial support from that community such as, during the last period of the Ottoman Empire, the empire was indebted and the community provided significant financial support to preserve the empire. The members of Khilafat Movement who are now Muhajirs and West Punjabis granted the money to preserve the Ottoman Empire but were unable to prevent its decline; it was one of the biggest political eminences in pre-Muhajir history.

1947–1958 

The Muhajirs of Pakistan were largely settled in Sindh province, particularly in the province's capital, Karachi, where the Muhajirs were in a majority. As a result of their domination of major Sindhi cities, there had been tensions between Muhajirs and the native Sindhis, and this has been a major factor in the shaping of Muhajir politics. The Muhajirs, upon their arrival in Pakistan, soon joined the Punjabi-dominated ruling elite of the newborn country due to their high rates of education and urban background. They possessed the required expertise for running Pakistan's nascent bureaucracy and economy. Although the Muhajirs were, socially, urbane and liberal, they sided with the country's religious political parties such as Jamiat Ulema-i-Pakistan (JUP) because of their non affiliation with any particular ethnic group.

Upon arrival in Pakistan, the Muhajirs did not assert themselves as a separate ethnic identity, being multi-ethnic themselves, but were at the forefront of trying to construct an Islamic Pakistani identity. Muhajirs dominated the bureaucracy of Sindh in the early years of the Pakistani state, largely due to their higher levels of educational attainment. Prior to the partition, Hindus dominated the professions of lawyers, teachers, and tradesmen in Sindh and the vacancies they left behind were filled up by the Muhajirs.

Many Urdu-speaking people had higher education and civil service experience from working for the British Raj and Muslim princely states. Out of the 101 Muslims in India's civil service, 95 chose to leave India. A third of those civil servants were Punjabis and there were as many Muhajirs as Punjabis. From 1947 to 1958, the Urdu-speaking Muhajirs held more jobs in the Government of Pakistan than their proportion in the country's population (3.3%). In 1951, of the 95 senior civil services jobs, 33 were held by the Urdu-speaking Muhajirs. The Muhajirs also had a strong hold over the economy, 36 of the 42 largest private companies belonged to Muhajirs, mainly those from the Indian state of Gujarat.

Gradually, as education became more widespread, Sindhis and Pashtuns, as well as other ethnic groups, started to take their fair share of the pool in the bureaucracy. But even by the early 1960s, 34.5 percent of Pakistan's civil servants were those who had not been born in the territory comprising Pakistan in 1947. Most of them were born in the United Provinces.

1958–1970 

On 27 October 1958, General Ayub Khan staged a coup and imposed martial law across Pakistan. By the time of Pakistan's first military regime (Ayub Khan, 1958), the Muhajirs had already begun to lose their influence in the ruling elite, especially after he changed the federal capital of Karachi to Islamabad. Ayub slowly began to pull non-muhajirs into the mainstream areas of the economy and politics, coupled with completely ousting Muhajirs from the ruling elite. This caused the Muhajirs' to agitate against the Ayub dictatorship from the early 1960s onwards. The relation was further detoriated when the quota system, revived and expanded by the 1962 constitution, increased the number of seats in professional colleges for students from backward areas which was anathema to the middle-class literate Muhajirs.

In the presidential election of 1965, the Muslim League split into two factions: the Muslim League (Fatima Jinnah) supported Fatima Jinnah, the younger sister of Muhammad Ali Jinnah, while the Convention Muslim League was supported General Ayub Khan. The Muhajirs had supported the Muslim League before the independence of Pakistan in 1947 and now supported the Muslim League of Fatima Jinnah, and this loyalty to Fatima Jinnah led to muhajirs being threatened and abused by Ayub Khan. The rivalry reached a peak after the electoral fraud of the 1965 presidential election and a post-election triumphal march by Gohar Ayub Khan, the son of General Ayub Khan, set off ethnic clashes between Pashtuns and Muhajirs in Karachi on 4 January 1965.

Four years later, on 24 March 1969, President Ayub Khan directed a letter to General Yahya Khan, inviting him to deal with the tense political situation in Pakistan. On 26 March 1969, General Yahya appeared on national television and proclaimed martial law over the country. Yahya subsequently abrogated the 1962 Constitution, dissolved parliament, and dismissed President Ayub's civilian officials.

1970–1977 

The 1970 Pakistani general election on 7 December 1970, saw the Awami League winning the elections. The Muhajirs had voted for the Jamaat-e-Islami Pakistan and Jamiat Ulema-e-Pakistan, this popular support for these parties resulted in ethnic muhajirs winning all six NA seats of Karachi and Hyderabad and 18 PA seats in Karachi and Hyderabad. Muhajirs had decisively lost their place in the ruling elite, but they were still a powerful economic force (especially in urban Sindh). When Zulfikar Ali Bhutto became the country's head of state in December 1971, the Muhajirs feared that they would be further sidelined, this time by the economic and political resurgence of Sindhis under Bhutto. From the 1970's and onwards, Bhutto implemented a series of policies in Sindh that the Urdu-speaking population viewed as an assault on their political and economic rights as well as cultural identity.

The Pakistan People's Party government nationalized the financial industry, educational institutions, and industry. The nationalization of Pakistan's educational institutions, financial institutions, and industry in 1972 by Prime Minister Zulfikar Ali Bhutto of Pakistan People's Party impacted the Muhajirs hardest as their educational institutions, commerce, and industries were nationalized without any compensation. Subsequently, the quota system introduced by Liaquat Ali Khan which allowed Muhajirs to take government jobs was reversed by Zulfiqar Ali Bhutto preventing them from taking government jobs and other government institutions, by introducing urban rural quota divide in government job slots. These policies also included the forceful retirement, dismissal or demotion of over 1,000 Urdu-speaking officers.

In 1972, language riots broke out between Sindhis and Muhajirs after the passage of the "Teaching, Promotion, and use of Sindhi Language" bill in July 1972 by the Sindh Assembly; which declared Sindhi as the only official language of Sindh. Due to the clashes, Prime Minister Zulfikar Ali Bhutto compromised and announced that Urdu and Sindhi would both be official languages in Sindh. The making of Sindhi as an equal language to Urdu for official purposes frustrated the Muhajirs as they did not speak the Sindhi language.

1977–1988 

In the 1977 Pakistani general election, Jamaat-e-Islami Pakistan and Jamiat Ulema-e-Pakistan joined in a coalition named the Pakistan National Alliance. Since the Muhajirs voted mostly for the Pakistan National Alliance, they participated in the 1977 right-wing movement against the Bhutto regime which was caused by the alleged electoral fraud by Pakistan People's Party. The movement was particularly strong among Karachi's middle and lower-middle-classes who clashed with state forces and political opponents in deadly gun battles and destroyed state-owned plants. On 5 July 1977, Chief of Army Staff General Muhammad Zia-ul-Haq led a coup d'état against Bhutto and imposed martial law, due to the rising unrest in the country. A year after Zia's coup, Jamaat e Islami started losing support to the newly founded APMSO, which believed that Jamat Islami and Jamiat Ulema Pakistan were "playing the muhajirs false". APMSO created several militant cells, such as Black Tigers and Nadeem Commandos, to counter the heavily armed Thunder squad of Islami Jamiat-e-Talaba. On March 18, 1984, the senior members of APMSO launched the Mohajir Qaumi Movement (MQM) – an ethnic Muhajir party that was to serve as the senior partner of the APMSO. Despite the arrival of a new muhajir political party, most muhajirs supported Jamaat e Islami till the fatal accident of Bushra Zaidi in 1985, which resulted in riots between the muhajir ethnopolitical elite and the mainly illiterate Pakhtun bus drivers. The Muhajir-Pashtun riots of 1985 resulted in MQM being seen as a alternative for muhajirs unsatisfied with the lack of support from the leaders of JeI. On August 8, 1986, a day still celebrated by the party as the moment the MQM came to the fore as a political force, Altaf Hussain drew thousands of Muhajirs to a rally in Nishtar Park where he declared Muhajirs a fifth sub-nationality within Pakistan. A year after the rally in Nishtar Park, MQM swept the local bodies' election in Karachi and Hyderabad.

1988–2016 

After the 1988 General Elections, the muhajir nationalist MQM emerged as the third-largest political party of Pakistan, in alliance with PPP. Differences developed between the PPP and Muhajirs after dozens were killed at an MQM congregation by Sindhi nationalists, and the alliance fell apart in the wake of ensuing violence. In 1990 Pakistani general election MQM won 15 NA seats and 27% of the total vote in Sindh, but this time MQM lent its support to Nawaz Sharif's Islami Jamhoori Ittehad instead. In June 1992, a massive Operation Cleanup was launched to rid the city of terrorism but muhajirs was selectively targeted. After the operation ended, MQM staged a comeback and a second crackdown against MQM was carried out during the tenure of Prime Minister Benazir Bhutto, in which many associated with the party were killed. In protest against these military operations many muhajirs boycotted the 1997 Pakistani general election, and this resulted in MQM winning only 12 NA seats and 20% of the total vote in Sindh.

After the military takeover in 1999 by Pervez Musharraf, the muhajirs backed Pervez Musharraf strongly till his resignation in 2008. During Musharraf's era, many muhajirs lent their support to Muttahida Majlis-e-Amal and this caused a decline in the vote banks of other parties especially the MQM, which in 2002 Pakistani general election won 13 NA seats and 15% of the total vote in Sindh. But after Musharraf's fall from power, MQM again started to dominate Muhajir politics, and this became apparent when MQM swept 2008 Pakistani general election and 2013 Pakistani general election in Karachi and won 19 NA seats and 18 NA seats respectively. MQM cotinued to dominate the political scene of Karachi and Hyderabad until 2016 when it broke up into four factions and collapsed.

2016–Present 
Amid a fractured MQM, the populist leader Imran Khan's PTI started to dominate Karachi's politics with a multiethnic support base from all walks of life, including the Muhajirs mainly from upper-middle and middle class, while lower-middle class muhajirs turned to Tehreek-e-Labbaik Pakistan. Despite tough opposition from PPP and TLP, PTI managed to bag the popular vote en masses during the 2018 Pakistani general elections, though with a lower voter turnout which was believed to be a result of Altaf Hussain's election boycott. PTI continued to win elections held in muhajir areas till 2022, but in 2023, after the merger of the MQM factions under the banner of MQM-P, MQM staged a comeback into Muhajir politics. In 2023 Karachi local government elections MQM-P's boycott resulted in very low voter turnouts in the Muhajir dominated areas of Karachi, especially Karachi Central District.

Social and political views 
The Muhajirs are socially urbane, liberal, and religiously tolerant. Politically, the Muhajirs echoed the views of the religious parties that eschewed pluralism and ethnic identities and propagated a holistic national unity based on the commonality of the Islamic faith followed by the majority of Pakistanis. The dichotomy between the Muhajirs' social and political dispositions was a result of the sense of insecurity that the community felt in a country where the majority of its inhabitants were 'natives'. Lacking the historical and cultural roots of native Pakistani ethnicity, the Muhajirs backed the state's project of constructing a homogeneous national identity that repulsed ethnic sentiment. But in the 1980s, Muhajir nationalism surged for the first time with the rise of the secular Muhajir nationalist party MQM, until it's collapse in 2016. The secularity of muhajirs has bought the community in constant violence with Pakistani Taliban. Shehreyar Zaidi identified todays Muhajirs as independent freethinkers, not bound to a particular ideology.

Society

Economic status 

Muhajirs are currently beleived to be the most affluent ethnic group of Pakistan and constitute a significant proportion Pakistan's upper-middle class. Muhajirs are a powerful economic force in Pakistan because of their domination of businesses and stock markets, and therefore pay more taxes than any other ethnic group of Pakistan. Muhajirs constitute 20% of Pakistan's elite and 33% upper classes, while constituting 7.1% of the population. A 2019 study by Jinnah Postgraduate Medical Center found that muhajir women have the highest employment rate and monthly income among all major ethnic groups of Pakistan. According to the 1951 census of Pakistan, less than 15 per cent of Muhajirs were unskilled labourers, with almost 61 percent classified as skilled workers and more than 5 percent belonging to professional and managerial backgrounds. Therefore, despite Muhajirs constituting 42.3% of Karachi's population, they hold 72.3% of the professional, administrative, and managerial jobs of Karachi. Majority of muhajirs (68.4%) live in planned areas and 88.9% have access to basic utilities. Muhajirs are very successful in finance institutions, and have founded most of Pakistan's banking institutions including State Bank of Pakistan, Habib Bank Limited, United Bank Limited, and Bank AL Habib.

Education 

Muhajirs are seen as the most-educated and literate ethnic group in Pakistan. This title has been held by muhajirs since the time of Partition of India, when the muhajirs had a literacy rate of 70% compared to Pakistan's average literacy rate of 16.4%. Because of the high levels of education, muhajirs quickly established themselves economically, socially, and professionally in the earlier years of post-partition, and today play a dominant role in educational institutions of Pakistan. In 2018 elections, the most educated candidates belonged to the muhajir nationalist MQM-P. The high literacy rate also results in the Muhajirs of Karachi mostly living in their own middle and upper middle class neighbourhoods such as Gulshan-e-Iqbal Town, Defence Housing Authority, Gulistan-e-Jauhar, and others. In his book, Pakistan: A Hard Country, Anatol Lieven claimed that the education, openness, and progressivism of Muhajirs is responsible for whatever social and economic dynamism exists in Pakistan. Their culture is driven by strong entrepreneurial spirit to succeed in society, and to maintain the "sophisticated, mild and civilised" image. Some prominent academics, poets, writers, journalists, and artists include Abdul Wahab, Ahmed Ali, Waseem Badami, and Abdul Haq.

Women 
Muhajir women are mostly liberal despite the cultural gender segregation in Pakistan. Muhajir women play an important part in politics, especially in MQM. During 1980s and 90s MQM trained muhajir women to run political offices, and that was the main reason behind the survival of MQM during Operation Clean-up, when most of MQM's male leadership was either killed or in exile. Women have also been used as armed guards in several MQM rallies, notably a mammoth rally held in July 1988. Persecution of muhajir women has also been used by muhajir nationalists as a rallying point against LEAs of Pakistan.

Muhajir women are the most educated female community in Pakistan, with an average of 8.9 years of education and 31% having a secondary or higher education. Because most Muhajirs are educated and settled in urban areas, most muhajirs allow an education and paid work for their daughters. Muhajir women are mostly married to other muhajirs as a survey found that 20 out of 21 muhajir women had muhajir husbands.

Notable people

Culture 

Muhajir culture is the culture of Urdu-speaking nation that migrated mainly from North India after the independence of Pakistan in 1947 generally to Karachi. The Muhajir culture refers to the Pakistani variation of Indo-Islamic culture and part of the Culture of Karachi city in Pakistan. It is a blend of Delhi, Hyderabad, Bengali, Bihari, and Uttar Pradesh cultures.

Language 

Urdu is an Indo-Aryan language spoken by Urdu-speaking people, chiefly in North India and Karachi. 
It is the national language and lingua franca of Pakistan, where it is also an official language alongside English.

Urdu has been described as a Persianised register of the Hindustani language; Urdu and Hindi share a common Sanskrit- and Prakrit-derived vocabulary base, phonology, syntax, and grammar, making them mutually intelligible during colloquial communication. While formal Urdu draws literary, political, and technical vocabulary from Persian, formal Hindi draws these aspects from Sanskrit; consequently, the two languages' mutual intelligibility effectively decreases as the factor of formality increases.

Urdu became a literary language in the 18th century and two similar standard forms came into existence in Delhi and Lucknow. Since the partition of India in 1947, a third standard has arisen in the Pakistani city of Karachi. According to the World Economic Forum, today, Urdu along with Hindi is considered the eighth most powerful language in the world and the most powerful in modern South Asia, due to the influence on the language of other south asian languages.

Cuisine 

Muhajir cuisine refers to the cuisine of the muhajir people and is covered under both Indian and Pakistani cuisines. Muhajirs, after arriving in Karachi, have revived their old culture, including numerous desserts, savory dishes, and beverages. The Mughal and Indo-Iranian heritage played an influential role in the making of their cuisine and therefore compared to other Pakistani cuisines, Muhajir cuisine tends to use royal cuisine specific to the old royal dynasties of now defunct states in ancient India. Most dastarkhawans (dining tables) include breads, rice, vegetable, and meat curry. Special dishes include biryani, qorma, kofta, seekh kabab, nihari, haleem, Nargisi koftay, roghani naan, naan, sheer-khurma (dessert), chai (sweet, milky tea), and paan are associated with Muhajir cuisine.

Traditional dress 

The traditional clothing of Muhajirs is the traditional clothing worn by Muslims in North India, and it has both Muslim and South Asian influences. Both Muslim men and women wear the shalwar kameez as a daily dress, and kurta, pyjama and brightly-coloured waistcoats for special occasions. Other traditional dresses for muhajirs include the sherwani, which is believed to have been introduced to Pakistan by Muhajirs, sari, which is an un-stitched stretch of woven fabric arranged over the body like a robe and Gharara which originated from the Nawabs' attempt to imitate the British evening gown.

Literature and poetry 

The majority of Muhajirs speak Urdu as their native tongue, therefore most poets and writers write in Urdu. Urdu literature, is composed of oral and written scripts and texts in the Urdu language in the form of poetry such as, Ghazals and Nazms and prose such as, dastans. There is a very rich tradition of Urdu literature and poetry running through the history of Muhajir culture. Poetry is the most important part of Urdu literature, and due to this Urdu is widely perceived as a language of poetry. Many aspects of Urdu poetry such as mushaira, a poetic symposium in which ghazals are recited, are considered some of the most important aspects of muhajir culture.

Urdu literature originated some time around the 14th century in present-day North India among the sophisticated gentry of the courts. The continuing traditions of Islam and patronisations of foreign culture centuries earlier by Muslim rulers, usually of Turkic or Afghan descent, marked their influence on the Urdu language given that both cultural heritages were strongly present throughout Urdu-speaking territory. Urdu's poetry took its final shape in the 17th century when it was declared the official language of the court, while literary prose started with the penning of Sabras in the year 1635 — in Deccan, by Mulla Asadullah Wajhi on the orders of Abdullah Qutb Shah.

Festivals 

Festivals celebrated by Muhajirs include religious, political, ethnic, and national festivals. Islamic festivals which are celebrated by Muhajirs include Eid-al-Fitr celebrated to mark the end of the month-long dawn-to-sunset fasting of Ramadan, Eid-al-Adha to honour the willingness of Abraham (Ibrahim) to sacrifice his son Ishmael (Ismail) as an act of obedience to God's command, and Ashoura to mourn the death of Husayn ibn Ali and celebrate the day of salvation for Moses and the Israelites from Biblical Egypt. Political celebrations include MQM Founding Day celebrated to mark the founding of the first Muhajir nationalist party Muttahida Qaumi Movement, beleived to be the architect of Muhajir identity, and APMSO Founding Day celebrated to mark the founding of the first Muhajir nationalist student union All Pakistan Muhajir Students Organization. Muhajirs celebrate Muhajir Cultural Day as an ethnic and cultural festival. To celebrate this day, rallies depart from all areas of Karachi to Mazar-e-Quaid, and political parties and civil society organisations set up their camps to welcome participants in the rally and to express solidarity.

Persecution

Massacres 
Muhajirs have been targeted in multiple massacres, which were mostly either executed by Pakistani state authorities, Punjabi–Pashtun Ittehad or Sindhi and Pashtun nationalists. Qasba Aligarh massacre, the most notable, was a massacre orchestrated by the recently settled and armed tribal people from KPK and Afghanistan in Qasba Colony, Aligarh Colony, and Sector 1-D of Orangi in Karachi in the early hours of the morning on 14 December 1986, and claimed the lives of more than 400 Muhajirs. The attack was believed to be a "revenge killing" as a result of an unsuccessful raid on an Afghan heroine processing and distribution centre in the Sohrab Goth area by the security forces in Karachi.

Some of the less notable massacre include 1988 Hyderabad, Sindh massacre, allegedly orchestrated by Sindhi nationalists on September 30, 1988, claiming over a thousand muhajir lives by firing indiscriminately at passers-by and shopkeepers, as well as at children, adults, and women; Pucca Qila Massacre, orchestrated by Sindh Police on 27 May 1990, claimed the lives of more than 31 Muhajir women and children; Operation Clean-up, a targeted crackdown on the ethnonationalist MQM political party by security forces claimed tens of thousands of lives, including Muhajir civilians. The European Muhajir Network claimed that that over 1.3 million Muhajirs have died in Pakistan as a result targeted killings and genocides.

Arbitrary arrests and enforced disappearances 
The practice of arbitrary arrests of muhajirs was widely used by security forces during 1990s. During 1995 Anti-MQM operations, over 75,000 muhajir civilians were arbitrarily arrested July and March. The practice continued into the 21st century as thousands of Muhajirs, believed to be the workers or sympathizers of the MQM political party have been targeted in enforced disappearance cases by state authorities in Karachi.

See also 
 Stranded Muhajirs in Bangladesh
 Muhajir Qaumi Movement
 Jinnahpur
 List of people from Karachi
 List of Muhajir people

Notes

References

Further reading 
 "Pakistan: The Sindhi-Muhajir conflict"
 "Gene Diversity among Some Muslim Populations of Western Uttar Pradesh"
 "Gene Diversity Analysis and Microdifferentiation Process in North Indian Muslim Populations"
 "The crisis of Mohajir identity" Harris Khalique. The News International.
 "The Captive State: Corruption, Intelligence Agencies, and Ethnicity in Pakistan"

External links

 "Muhajir diaspora"
 "Quotas and Karachi"
 "The Mohajir Identity in Pakistan: The Natives' Perspective"



 
Muhajir communities
Social groups of Pakistan
Ethnic groups in Pakistan
Social groups of Sindh
Cultural assimilation
Muhajir diaspora
Indian emigrants to Pakistan
Islamic terminology
Urdu-speaking people